Macrocheles reductus is a species of mite in the family Macrochelidae.

References

reductus
Articles created by Qbugbot
Animals described in 1966